Galla Creek Township is a former township of Pope County, Arkansas. It was located in the southern part of the county and contained part of the Holla Bend National Wildlife Refuge.

Cities, towns, and villages
 Holla Bend
 Pottsville

References
 United States Board on Geographic Names (GNIS)
 United States National Atlas

External links
 US-Counties.com

Townships in Pope County, Arkansas
Townships in Arkansas